Svidník District (okres Svidník) is a district in the Prešov Region of eastern Slovakia.

Until 1918, the district was part of the Hungarian county of Šariš (Sáros).

Municipalities

Belejovce
Beňadikovce
Bodružal
Cernina
Cigla
Dlhoňa
Dobroslava
Dubová
Dukovce
Fijaš
Giraltovce
Havranec
Hrabovčík
Hunkovce
Jurkova Voľa
Kalnište
Kapišová
Kečkovce
Kobylnice
Korejovce
Kračúnovce
Krajná Bystrá
Krajná Poľana
Krajná Porúbka
Krajné Čierno
Kružlová
Kuková
Kurimka
Ladomirová
Lúčka
Lužany pri Topli
Matovce
Medvedie
Mestisko
Mičakovce
Miroľa
Mlynárovce
Nižná Jedľová
Nižná Pisaná
Nižný Komárnik
Nižný Mirošov
Nižný Orlík
Nová Polianka
Okrúhle
Príkra
Pstriná
Radoma
Rakovčík
Rovné
Roztoky
Soboš
Stročín
Svidnička
Svidník
Šarbov
Šarišský Štiavnik
Šemetkovce
Štefurov
Vagrinec
Valkovce
Vápeník
Vyšná Jedľová
Vyšná Pisaná
Vyšný Komárnik
Vyšný Mirošov
Vyšný Orlík
Železník
Želmanov

Notable people 
 

Fedor Vico (born 1944), Slovak caricaturist

References 

 
Districts of Slovakia
Geography of Prešov Region